Gloria Coates (born October 10, 1938, in Wausau, Wisconsin) is an American composer who has lived in Munich since 1969. She studied with Alexander Tcherepnin, Otto Luening, and Jack Beeson.

Music

Her music features canonic structures and prominent, sometimes exclusive, glissandos, being "characterized by extremely strict, even rigid technical procedures (canonic structures), which are often worked out with unusual musical materials (glissandi)". Her music is postminimalist, marked by the tension "not only between material and technique (...an attempt to give structure to chaos), but even more so between what would have to be termed 'sober-technical' compositional principles and the genuine direct expressive power and emotionality of the music".

As one interview describes:

Mark Swed: “Coates is a master of microtones, of taking a listener to aural places you never knew could exist and finding the mystical spaces between tones.” [5]

As is described by Kyle Gann's liner notes to one of her albums:

In Kyle Gann's article "A Symphonist Stakes Her Claim", Gloria Coates was crowned, "the greatest woman symphonist" for her passionate pursuit and persistence in a domain that is dominated by men. However, this ambitious pursuit to be a woman symphonist has not been a conscious effort to set herself apart from the other female composers, instead in an interview she commented that it came through a natural manifestation trying to convey something deep within her. "When I did, I thought, 'That's really gutsy of me to call it a symphony,'" she said from her home in Munich, "I always had an idea of symphonies being in the 19th century, somehow. I never set out to write a symphony as such. It has to do with the intensity of what I'm trying to say and the fact that it took 48 different instrumental lines to say it, and that the structures I was using had evolved over many years. I couldn't call it a little name."

Painting

Besides composing, Gloria Coates also paints abstract expressionistic paintings that are often used as the covers for her albums. In her paintings, complementary colors such as red and green, yellow and blue, interact and mix with one another in small strokes. The painterly manner, with layers of swirls of colors, is reminiscent of the style of Vincent van Gogh.

Compositions

The following is a list of Coates' musical compositions based on Theresa Kalin, edited by Christian Dieck

A. Instrumental music

a) Works for orchestra 
 Symphony No. 1 „Music on Open Strings“ (1972)
 Symphony No. 2 „ Music on Abstract Lines/ Illuminatio in Tenebris“ (1973/74)
 Symphony No. 3 „ Symphony for Strings“/ „Symphony Nocturne“ (1974)
 Symphony No. 3 – 2. version (Concerto for violin) (2006)
 Symphony No. 4 „Chiaroscuro“ (1984/89)
 Symphony No. 5 „Drei mystische Gesänge“ (text: Alexandra Coates) for choir and orchestra (1985)
 Symphony No. 6 „Music in Microtones“ (1985/86)
 Symphony No. 7 (1989/90)
 Symphony No. 8 „Indian Sounds“ for voices and orchestra (1990/91)
 Symphony No. 9 „Homage to Van Gogh“ (1992-1994)
 Symphony No. 10 „Drones of Druids on Celtic Ruins“ for brass and percussion (1992/93)
 Symphony No. 11 (1997)
 Symphony No. 12 (1998)
 Symphony No. 13 (2000)
 Symphony No. 14 (2001–02) "The Americans"
 Symphony No. 15 (2004/05) "Homage to Mozart"
 Symphony No. 16 „Time Frozen“ (1993)
 Vita –Anima della Terra (text: Leonardo da Vinci) for soli, mixed choir and orchestra (1972/76)
 Planets (1973/74)
 Fonte di Rimini (text: Leonardo da Vinci) for mixed choir and orchestra (1976/84)
 Transitions (1984)
 Cantata da Requiem (1972)
 Stardust and Dark Matter (2018)

b) Chamber orchestra with voice 
 Voices of Women in Wartime. Cantata da Requiem for soprano solo, viola, violoncello, piano and percussion (1972)
 The Force for Peace in War. Cantata da Requiem for soprano, tape and orchestra (1988)
 Wir tönen allein (Paul Celan) for soprano, timpani, percussion and string orchestra (1988)
 Rainbow across the Night Sky for female voices and ensemble (1990)
 Emily Dickinson Lieder for solo voice and Chamber orchestra (1989)
 Cette Blanche Agonie (text: Stéphane Mallarmé) for soprano, English horn, oboe, timpani, percussion and string orchestra (1988)

c) Chamber music

1. Solo-instrument 
 Colony Air for piano solo (1982)
 Colony Air No. 2 for harpe (1982)
 Reaching for the Moon for flute (1988)
 To Be Free Of It for one to three percussionists (1988/89)
 Castles in the Air for Tenorsaxophone solo (1993)
 Märchensuite for flute (1996)
 Sonata for Violin Solo (1999)
 Sonata for Piano No. 1 (1972)
 Sonata for Piano No. 2 (2001)
 The Books for piano (2003)
 Five Abstractions for piano solo (1962)
 Interludium for organ solo (1962)
 Star Tracks Through Darkness for organ solo (1974/89)
 Prayers without words for organ solo (2002)

2. Two instruments 
 Sylken for flute and piano (1961)
 Fantasy about „Wie schön leuchtet der Morgenstern" for viola and organ (1973)
 Overture to Saint Joan for organ and percussion
 Fiori for flute and tape (1988)
 Fiori and the Princess for flute and tape
 Blue Monday for guitar and percussion (1988/89)
 Elegy No. 2 for Soprano saxophone and piano (2002/2011)
 Nightscape for contrabass and percussion (2008)
 Reaching into Light for two percussionists (2010)

3. Three and more instruments 
 Trio for flute, oboe and piano (1962)
 From a Poetry Album for harp, violoncello and percussion (1976)
 Night Music for Tenor-Saxophone, piano and gongs (1992)
 Piano Trio Lyric Suite for violin, violoncello and piano (1993/1996)
 Lyric Suite No. 2 for flute (also flute alto), violoncello and piano (2002) 
 Five Abstractions of Poems by Emily Dickinson for woodwind quartet (flute, clarinet, oboe and bassoon)
 Heinrich von Ofterdingen (Homage an Novalis) for flute, two violoncelli and harp (1996)
 Glissando String Quartet (1962)
 String Quartet No. 1 „Protestation Quartet" (1965/66)
 String Quartet No. 2 „Mobile“ (1971)
 String Quartet No.3 (1975)
 String Quartet No. 4 (1976)
 Six Movements for String Quartet (1978)
 String Quartet No. 5 (1988)
 String Quartet No. 6 (1999)
 String Quartet No. 7 „Angels“ with organ (2001)
 String Quartet No. 8 (2001/02)
 String Quartet No. 9 (2007)
 String Quartet No. 10 „Among the Asteroids“ (1971/76)
 Halley´s Comet Nonet for flute (piccolo), oboe (English horn), bassoon (contrabassoon), horn and string quintet (1974)

B. Vocal compositions

a) Works for choir 
 Dies Sanctificatus from Saint Joan for soprano, alto, tenor a cappella (1961)
 Missa Brevis (1964)
 Sing onto the Lord a new song for mixed choir a cappella (1964)
 Te Deum aus Saint Joan for mixed choir a cappella (1964)
 The Beautitudes for soli and organ (1978)
 Der Schwan from Licht (Alexandra Coates) for mixed choir a cappella (1988)

b) Works for Solo voice

1. Voice with piano 
 The Sighing Wind (Gloria Coates) (1950)
 Twilight (Gloria Coates) (1961)
 Ophelia Lieder from Hamlet by Shakespeare for middle voice and Liederharfe (1964/65) 
 Komplementär (Friederike Mayröcker) (1999)
 Catch the wind (text: Alexandra Coates)
 Songs on poems by Emily Dickinson for voice and piano

2. Solo voice with ensemble 
 Voices of Women in Wartime - Cantata da Requiem for soprano solo, viola, violoncello, piano and percussion (1972)
 The Tune without the Words (Emily Dickinson) for voice, Glockenspiel, percussion and timpani (1975)
 Go the Great Way (Emily Dickinson) for voice, percussion, timpani and organ (1982)

C. Electronic music 
 Eine Stimme ruft elektronische Klänge auf for Live electronics, modulator, voice and laser (1971)
 Neptune Odyssey for tape. Musique concrete (1975)
 Ecology No. 1. Realized in the electroacoustic Studio of the Musikakademie Krakau (1978)

D. Multimedia 
 Music heard visually Presto (1972)
 Cosmos Klang (1973)
 Musik-Kunst (1990) Premiere of the  Symphony No. 4, performance of Symphony No. 2, Stage work with paintings from Ursula and Dietmar Thiele-Zoll
 Abraham Lincoln´s Cooper Union Adresson poems by Gloria Coates and texts by Martin Luther King (2003)
 Entering the Unknown for spinett, string quartet and video (Birgit Ramsauer) (2004)

E. Theatre 
 Bühnenmusik zu Jedermann for flute, oboe and percussion (1961)
 Musik zum Schauspiel Hamlet von Shakespeare for choir, organ and chamber orchestra (1964/65)
 The three Billy Goat´s Gruff Interactive music theatre piece for children between 3–6 years (1965)
 La Vox Humaine (von John Cocteau) for two percussionists and ballet (2010)
 Stolen Identity. Chamber Opera for soprano, countertenor, Bassbariton, string quartet, piano and percussion (2012)

F. Music in film productions
 Politik nach Notenblatt (1981, Klaus Croissant, BR-Fernsehen-Dokumentation) with Voices of Women in Wartime
 Turin- Die geräderte Stadt (1983, Gabriel Heim, BR-Fernsehen-Fernsehfilm) with Stein quartet No. 4
 Death of Cain (2001, Ido Angel, Ido Angel Films Tel Aviv, Israel- Independent Film) with Symphony No. 2
 Another Kind (2011, Jonathan Blitstein, Blitstein Films- Independent Film) with some orchestral pieces

Articles by Gloria Coates (selection) 
 Lutoslawski im Seminar. In: Neue Musikzeitung, October/ November 1975, No. 5, 24. year., p. 12
 Desert Plants. A History of American Music. Rundfunkproduktion WDR 1978 (Ms.)
 Zusammen mit Detlef GOJOWY: Rezension zu Walter Zimmermanns Dessert Plants. In: Die Musikforschung, 33, 1980, booklet 2, p. 206-207
 Erstes Internationales Musikfestival in der UdSSR. In: Musica, 25. Jahrgang 1981, booklet 4, 
 Russian immigrant composers in the United States.  Rundfunkproduktion WDR 1986 (Ms.)
 A Cockatoo Will Do. In: The Twentieth-Century Recorder (USA), XXXI, Dez. 1990, No. 4, 
 Karl Amadeus Hartmann/ Reflektiert und in die Zukunft gedacht. In: Musica Viva; Eine Sprache der Gegenwart 1945-95, edited by Renate Ulm for the Bayerischer Rundfunk 1995, Mainz 1995, also: 
 15 programs in: Open House West Germany Radio, Cologne
 Music little reviews for the: State Times, Baton Rouge, Louisiana

Discography (selection)

Symphonies 
 Symphony No.1 (1973) "Music on Open Strings" 1980 (live) Musica Viva Munich, Bavarian Radio Symphony Orchestra, Elgar Howarth, cond. (cpo  999 392-2 
 Symphony No.2 (1974) "Illuminatio in Tenebris" 1990 (live), Stuttgart Philharmonic, Wolf-Dieter Hauschild, cond. Classic Produktion Osnabrück 999 590-2
 Gloria Coates: Symphony No. 2 / Homage To Van Gogh / Anima Della Terra (cpo 1998); Stuttgarter Philharmoniker, Wolf-Dieter Hauschild/ Musica-viva-ensemble Dresden, Jürger Wirrmann/ Orchester des Internationalen Jugendfestspieltreffens Bayreuth 1984, Matthias Kuntzsch/ Soloists: Jirina Markova, Soprano, Gerda Maria Knauer, Alto, Miroslav Kopp, Tenor, Piotre Nowacki, Bass/ Ensemble Das Neue Werk, Hamburg, Dieter Cichewiecz
 Symphony No.3 (1975)"Holographic Universe" 2007 (live), Cambridge Orchestra, UK, Sheppard-Skaerved, violin, Neil Thomson, cond., Tzadik TZ 8096 
 Symphony No.4 (1984)"Chiaroscuro" 1990 (live), Stuttgarter Philharmoniker, Wolf-Dieter Hauschild, cond. CPO 999 392-2 
 Symphony No.7 (1989) SD Radio commission; 1991 Stuttgart Philharmonic, Georg Schmöhe, cond. CPO 999 392-2, 
 Symphony Nr.7(1989) Musica Viva Munich 1997 (live), Bavarian Radio Symphony, Olaf Henzold, cond. (Naxos 8.559289 
 Symphony No.8 (1990–91) "Indian Sounds" 1992 (live) Musica-Viva-Dresden, Juergen Wirrmann, cond. New World Records 80599-2 
 Symphony No.9 (1992–93) "Homage to Van Gogh" 1995 (live) Schwinger Dresden, Musica-Viva-Dresden, Juergen Wirrmann, cond. CPO 999 590-2 
 Symphony No. 10 (1989) "Drones of Druids on Celtic Ruins", CalArts Orchestra, Susan Allen, cond. (Naxos 8.559848)
 Symphony No.14 (2001–02) "American Fathers" 2003 (live) Residence Munich, Munich Chamber Orchestra, Christoph Poppen, cond. Naxos 8.559289 
 Symphony No.15 (2004) "Homage to Mozart" 2006 Passau Festival, Vienna Radio Symphony Orchestra, Michael Boder, cond. Naxos 8.559371 
 Symphony No.16 (1993) "Time Frozen" 1995 (live) 25 Years Das Neue Werk Hamburg, Das Neue Werk, Dieter Cichewiecz, cond. CPO 999 590-2

Chamber music 
Kreutzer Quartet (2002) – String Quartets Nos. 1, 5, 6 (Naxos 8.559091)
 Kreutzer Quartet (2003) – String Quartets Nos. 2, 3, 4, 7 and 8 (Naxos 8.559152)
 Kreutzer Quartet (2010) – String Quartet No. 9, Solo Violin Sonata, Lyric Suite for Piano Trio (Naxos 8.559666)
 Kreutzer Quartet (2013) - "Piano Quintet", Roderick Chadwick, Piano (Naxos 8.559848)
 Kreutzer Quartet – Coates, G.: String Quartets Nos. 1–9 (3-CD Box Set) (Naxos 8.503240)
 Gloria Coates: Symphony No. 15 (2004–2005), Cantata da Requiem (1972), Transitions (1984) (Naxos 8.559371); Vienna Radio Symphony Orchestra/Boder, Teri Dunn (Sopran)/ Talisker Players, Ars Nova Ensemble Nuremberg/Heider (2007)
 Gloria Coates: At Midnight (Tzadik New York, 2013)
 Explore America – String Quartet No. 1: Protestation Quartet (Naxos 8.559187)
 Bezaly: Solo Flute From A to Z, Vol. 2 – Gloria Coates: Reaching for the Moon (Naxos BIS-CD-1259)
 Class Of ’38 – Symphony No. 15, „Homage to Mozart“: III. What Are Stars (Naxos 8.557087)
 „…für Violine solo“ (2004) – Sonata for violin solo (2000), Andreas Lucke (Cavalli Records CCD 133)
 Vitality begun (2003) – Komplementär, Verwelkte Bücher, 15 Songs on Poems by Emily Dickinson (Cavalli Records CCD 308)
 Flötenmusik von Komponistinnen (2011) – Phantom für Flöte und Klavier (Thorofon CTH 2577)

References

 Swed, Mark. Saturday, November 15, 2014. "Gloria Coates' great oddity on display at REDCAT", Los Angeles Times.
 Claudia Schweitzer et. al.: Annäherung XIII - Annäherung an sieben Komponistinnen. Kassel: Furore, 2003.
 Komponisten in Bayern. Dokumente musikalischen Schaffens im 20. und 21. Jahrhundert, Vol. 54: Gloria Coates; Verlag Hans Schneider, Tutzing 2012; 
 Gisela SCHUBERT: „Gloria Coates“, in „Musik in Geschichte und Gegenwart“ (2. Auflage), section person Vol. 2, Kassel 2001, p. 1281-1283
 Christa JOST: "Gloria Coates“, in Komponisten der Gegenwart'', edited by Hans-Werner Heister und Walter-Wolfgang Sparrer, Berlin, 21. Mai 2001, p. 1-2

External links
Gloria Coates' website
 An Interview with Gloria Coates by Robert Burns Neveldine (original currently unavailable)
Interview with Gloria Coates, May 19, 1995
Gloria Coates on NAXOS
News on Naxos
Finding aid to Gloria Coates papers at Columbia University. Rare Book & Manuscript Library.

1938 births
20th-century classical composers
21st-century American composers
21st-century classical composers
American women classical composers
American classical composers
Living people
People from Wausau, Wisconsin
20th-century American women musicians
20th-century American composers
21st-century American women musicians
20th-century women composers
21st-century women composers